William Wallace Wood (November 15, 1894 – August 20, 1966) was an American football player and coach.  He served as the head football coach at Gettysburg College from 1919 to 1926 and at Wesleyan University from 1927 to 1929, compiling a career college football record of 51–36–7.  Wood played football at Pennsylvania State College from 1913 to 1915.  While coaching at Wesleyan, Wood earned a degree from the Yale Divinity School.

Wood was born on November 15, 1894 in Pottstown, Pennsylvania.  He was ordained a Presbyterian minister and was appointed chaplain at Sailors' Snug Harbor in Staten Island, New York in 1939.  He remained there until 1957, when he retired to a farm in Gettysburg, Pennsylvania.  Wood died of a blood disorder on August 20, 1966, at a hospital in York, Pennsylvania.

Head coaching record

References

1894 births
1966 deaths
20th-century American clergy
20th-century Presbyterian ministers
American football centers
American football tackles
American Presbyterian ministers
Gettysburg Bullets football coaches
Penn State Nittany Lions football players
Wesleyan Cardinals football coaches
Yale Divinity School alumni
People from Pottstown, Pennsylvania
Sportspeople from Montgomery County, Pennsylvania